The Milwaukee Brewers Major League Baseball (MLB) franchise of the National League has employed 19 managers and 10 general managers (GMs) during its 50 seasons of play. The general manager controls player transactions, hiring and firing of the coaching staff, and negotiates with players and agents regarding contracts.

Owners
William R. Daley & Dewey Soriano
Bud Selig
Wendy Selig-Prieb
Mark Attanasio
Robert D. Beyer
Antony Ressler
Giannis Antetokounmpo

General managers

Other executives
Gord Ash
Robert C. Cannon
Larry Haney
Bill Lajoie
Reid Nichols
Dan O'Brien
Laurel Prieb
Bill Veeck

References
Specific

General

External links
Baseball America: Executive Database

 
 
Milwaukee
owners and executives